"A Winter amid the Ice" is an 1855 short adventure story by Jules Verne.

The story was first printed in April–May 1855 in the magazine Musée des familles. It was later reprinted by Pierre-Jules Hetzel in the collection Doctor Ox (1874), as part of the Voyages Extraordinaires series. Three English translations ("A Winter amid the Ice" by George Makepeace Towle, "A Winter Among the Ice-Fields" by Abby L. Alger, and "A Winter's Sojourn in the Ice" by Stephen William White) were published in 1874.

References

Notes

Citations

1855 short stories
1874 short stories
Short stories by Jules Verne
Nautical short stories

cs:Doktor Ox#Zajatci polárního moře